Richard Dennis Druschel (born January 15, 1952) is a former professional American football player who played guard for one season for the Pittsburgh Steelers. That one season led to a Super Bowl IX victory over the Minnesota Vikings.

References

1952 births
Living people
People from Ellwood City, Pennsylvania
Players of American football from Pennsylvania
American football offensive guards
NC State Wolfpack football players
Pittsburgh Steelers players